BBC Radio Cymru is a Welsh language radio network owned and operated by BBC Cymru Wales, a division of the BBC. It broadcasts on two stations across Wales on FM, DAB, digital TV and online.

The main network broadcasts for  hours a day from 5:30am to midnight with overnight programming simulcast from the BBC World Service after closedown. 

A second station, Radio Cymru 2, providing separate music and sports programming, broadcasts on digital and online platforms.

Radio Cymru's managing editor is Dafydd Meredydd, a former presenter and producer for both stations.

Overview
BBC Radio Cymru began broadcasting on the morning of Monday 3 January 1977 – its first programme was an extended news bulletin presented at 6:45am by Gwyn Llewellyn and Geraint Jones. This was followed at 7am by the first edition of the breakfast magazine show , presented by Hywel Gwynfryn with contributions from a network of local reporters in studios across Wales. The first record played on Radio Cymru was Plas-y-Bryniau by Hergest.

The station was the first broadcasting outlet dedicated wholly to programmes in Welsh, allowing much more airtime for such output than had previously been available on the old Radio 4 Wales (or its predecessors the Welsh Home Service and, before that, the BBC Welsh Regional Programme).

Initially, the service was part-time and restricted to breakfast shows, extended news bulletins at breakfast, lunchtime & early evening and a number of off-peak opt-outs from a sustaining Radio 4 Wales feed.

In November 1979, Radio Cymru's programming was expanded to 65 hours a week, introducing mid-morning output on weekdays, along with a growing line-up of dramas, light entertainment and documentaries. The network continued to expand over the next two decades before achieving a continuous service of up to 20 hours a day.

Later developments in the 21st century saw Radio Cymru introducing a nightly youth strand, C2, and regional opt-outs for South West Wales, which were axed in 2008 but later reintroduced to provide live commentary of Swansea City A.F.C. matches. The station has also been streaming online since January 2005.

Radio Cymru is similar in format to many "general" radio stations, with news programmes at breakfast ('First Post'), lunchtime ( – a debate-centred programme), and drive-time ('Afternoon Post'); together with presenter-driven sequences mixing music with guests, calls from listeners and competitions. Radio Cymru also produces drama, features, current affairs and sports programming.

Over the years, it has done much to promote the language, with its sports commentators coining new terms which later became accepted by Welsh linguists.

Listening figures
According to RAJAR, the station has a weekly audience of 135,000 listeners and a listening share of 3.4%, as of December 2022. The average number of hours per listener is 13.5 hours a week.

Presenters

Notable current presenters include:

Shân Cothi (Bore Cothi)
Lisa Gwilym (Radio Cymru 2 – Monday-Thursday mornings)
Hywel Gwynfryn (Sunday afternoons)
Caryl Parry Jones (Monday-Thursday nights)
Huw Stephens (Thursday evenings)

Radio Cymru 2

On 19 September 2016, BBC Cymru launched a pop-up radio station,  (Radio Cymru More), broadcasting for three months in the run-up to the station's 40th anniversary. Consisting of five hours of music-led entertainment programming each weekday, Radio Cymru Mwy was available on DAB in south east Wales and online.

Six months after the station closed, BBC Cymru announced it would launch a permanent second station, Radio Cymru 2. The new service airs for two hours every morning on digital and online platforms, as a music and entertainment alternative to the main network, which airs the breakfast news programme, Post Cyntaf.

BBC Radio Cymru 2 began broadcasting at 6.30am on 29 January 2018, initially offering a separate daily breakfast show. It airs as an opt-out service from 7–11am from Mondays to Thursday, 7-9am on Friday and Saturday, 9-11am on Fridays and 7-10am on Sundays.

Since launch, the service has expanded to carry regular additional sports commentaries - particularly on football and rugby - on midweek nights and at weekends, as well as occasional music-led special programming.

On 4 August 2022, the station announced plans to expand BBC Radio Cymru 2's programming from 15 to 60 hours a week, offering a Welsh language music-based schedule.

As of 3 October 2022, Radio Cymru 2 airs an additional two-hour mid-morning show each weekday. Further expansion of the station's schedule is subject to regulatory approval.

Since the initial expansion of the station's schedule, Radio Cymru 2 has altered its music policy and now plays a greater proportion of English-language music, compared to the Welsh-led playlist on the main network.

Transmission
BBC Radio Cymru is broadcast across Wales FM and DAB. It is also available on Freeview in Wales, throughout the UK on Freesat, Sky, Virgin Media and internationally online on BBC Sounds. As Radio Cymru was created from an opt-out of BBC Radio 4, it inherited the FM transmitters previously used by Radio 4 across Wales. At the time of the station's launch, it was the only radio service in the UK broadcasting solely on FM.

BBC Radio Cymru 2 is broadcast across Wales on DAB. It is also available on Freeview in Wales, throughout the UK on Freesat, Sky, Virgin Media and online.

Main transmitters

Relays

See also
List of Celtic-language media

References

External links 

BBC Radio Cymru 2 on Facebook
BBC Radio Cymru 2 on Twitter

1977 establishments in Wales
BBC Cymru Wales
BBC regional radio stations
British radio networks
Radio stations established in 1977
Radio stations in Wales
Indigenous radio
Welsh-language mass media